Lady Charlotte Murray (2 August 1754 – 4 April 1808) was a Scottish botanist and author.  She was the eldest child of John Murray, 3rd Duke of Atholl, and Charlotte Murray, Duchess of Atholl. Her paternal grandfather was the Jacobite general Lord George Murray while her maternal grandfather was the Hanoverian James Murray, 2nd Duke of Atholl.

She is best known for her two-volume work The British Garden, which ran to two or three editions in her lifetime, the second (and possibly the first) being in 1799, and the third in 1805 or 1808, and another in 1880. The book was targeted at young people and considered the Linnaean system and how it can be used to discover the name of an unknown plant.

She also produced numerous botanical illustrations.

In 1793, Lady Charlotte discovered a double variety of Geranium pratense which she sent to Lady Banks.

She died in Bath on 4 April 1808, unmarried. She was buried in Bath Abbey.

Works

References

External links
 1808 edition, Volume 1

1754 births
1808 deaths
18th-century British botanists
English botanical writers
18th-century British women writers
Daughters of British dukes
19th-century British botanists